Daniel Stephen Rodimer (born May 22, 1978), also known by his ring name Dan Rodman, is an American retired professional wrestler, former football player, and former political candidate. In 2006, he signed a one-year developmental contract with WWE.

Rodimer won the Republican primary for Nevada's 3rd congressional district in 2020. He lost narrowly to Democratic incumbent Susie Lee in the November 2020 general election. He has garnered endorsements from President Donald Trump, Ted Cruz, the National Rifle Association (NRA),  and the National Right to Life Committee (NRLC).  Just minutes before the March 5, 2021 filing deadline, he announced his candidacy for Texas's 6th congressional district special election.

Early life and education 
Rodimer grew up in Rockaway, New Jersey, and attended Seton Hall Preparatory High School in West Orange. Before wrestling, Rodimer played college football at the University of South Florida, where he was a member of Lambda Chi Alpha fraternity. Rodimer attended the Ave Maria School of Law in Vineyards, Florida, where he graduated in 2013.

Career 
Rodimer played semi-pro football for the Tampa Bay Barracudas and in the Arena Football League. He also worked as a personal trainer.

World Wrestling Entertainment (2006–2007)
Rodimer got into wrestling by becoming a contestant in the 2004 Tough Enough competition.

On July 12, 2006, Rodimer was signed to a developmental contract with World Wrestling Entertainment and was assigned to Deep South Wrestling. His first match came on September 7, when he defeated Heath Miller. On September 24, he had his first televised match in DSW as Dan Rodimer, defeating Tommy Suede.

Rodimer spent the first half of 2007 wrestling primarily in Ohio Valley Wrestling, WWE's other developmental territory. He feuded with Atlas DaBone throughout February and March.

Rodimer made his debut on Heat, beating Eugene. He then returned to OVW. Daniel appeared on Heat twice more that year. Rodimer was then transferred to the new Florida Championship Wrestling territory. However, he was released from his contract on August 22, 2007.

Political career 
In 2018, Rodimer ran for Nevada State Senate. He lost to Valerie Weber in the primary election by 142 votes, despite outspending her nearly two-to-one.

In 2019, Rodimer announced his bid for Nevada's 3rd congressional district. He lost to incumbent Susie Lee in the general election.

In March 2021, Rodimer announced his candidacy for Texas's 6th congressional district special election. He was noted for dramatically changing his accent and persona in his campaign ad compared to his run in Nevada the previous year. He placed eleventh in the crowded jungle primary, attaining 2.6 percent of the vote share.

Rodimer cast doubt on the integrity of the 2020 presidential election, saying "I think that we had some serious issues with this election and we've got to make sure that doesn't happen again," in response to whether he believed the election was "stolen". Rodimer also said of the storming of the Capitol by a mob of Trump supporters, "On January 6, people come to me all the time, they say, 'Big Dan Rodimer, what would you have done differently?' Well, you know what? I wouldn't have been hiding under my desk like all the other folks. I would have been out there, walking to the very, very front, top of the stairs saying, 'hey, the fact is we are all Americans. We want fair and free elections."

Personal life
Rodimer resides in Mansfield, Texas, where he moved with his family in 2021. Prior to this, the family lived in Las Vegas, where Rodimer was a member of the Clark County School District Safety Advisory Committee in 2018.

Assault accusations
Rodimer has been accused three times of assault but has no convictions. After an arrest on charges of battery in 2010, Rodimer entered a deferred prosecution agreement. In that agreement he admitted to committing the offense, and upon completion of a six-week anger management training course the charge was dropped. He was also accused of assault in 2011 and 2013, according to records from the Collier County Sheriff's Office; however, in both cases no charges were filed.

References

External links 
 Official website
 OWoW Profile

1978 births
Living people
21st-century American politicians
American male professional wrestlers
Ave Maria School of Law alumni
Candidates in the 2021 United States elections
Nevada Republicans
People from Denville, New Jersey
People from Mansfield, Texas
Players of American football from New Jersey
Professional wrestlers from New Jersey
Seton Hall Preparatory School alumni
South Florida Bulls football players
Sportspeople from Las Vegas
Texas Republicans
Tough Enough contestants